Oldies-45 was a sub-label of Vee-Jay Records. It was started in 1963 to distribute their old 45 rpm records.  Some Beatles singles were reissued briefly in 1964 on the label.

See also
 List of record labels

Defunct record labels of the United States
Record labels established in 1963